C. S. Ranga Iyer (1895–1963) was an Indian journalist, politician, Indian independence activist and social reformer.

Personal life 

C. S. Ranga Iyer was born in the Madras Presidency in 1895. He had his education in Madras Presidency and on completion of his education, started a career as a journalist. He served as the editor of the English-language newspaper The Independent. During this period, he wrote Father India, a parody of Katherine Mayo's Mother India.

Ranga Iyer was also active in politics and served as a member of the Indian National Congress until his expulsion in 1929.

In the Imperial Legislative Council 

Ranga Iyer was elected to the Imperial Legislative Council in 1923. In 1929, he proposed the Untouchability Abolition Bill in the Imperial Legislative Council but later withdrew his proposal reasoning that prominent members of the Congress as Mahatma Gandhi and Jawaharlal Nehru were opposed to the bill.

Works

Notes

References 

 

1895 births
1963 deaths
20th-century Indian journalists
Indian National Congress politicians
Members of the Imperial Legislative Council of India
Indian social reformers